Wang Tuoh (9 January 1944 – 9 August 2016) was a Taiwanese writer, public intellectual, literary critic, and politician. His name was originally Wang Hung-chiu (王紘久).

Writing career 
Wang Tuoh published his first short story, The Hanging Tree in 1970, and went on to write a series of stories set in his home village of Badouzi that drew heavily on his own experiences in a small, insular village where everyone is part of a larger family that has been there for five generations. The most well-known of these stories is the novella Auntie Jinshui (金水嬸; published September 1976) which describes the story of the eponymous Auntie Jinshui. Auntie Jinshui is a street peddler who has successfully raised and educated six sons, but falls upon especially hard times after being swindled by a priest introduced to her by one of her sons. She then falls behind on her payments to her Hui (會), an informal village credit network, and finds herself gradually ostracized from her friends and family. This novella was also later made into a movie.

His novels are The Story of Cowbelly Harbor (牛肚港的故事; published 1982) and Taipei, Taipei! (台北，台北!; published 1983), both written while he was in jail as a political prisoner.

Political career 
After being freed from prison in 1984, he joined the political opposition to the ruling Kuomintang and in 1995 was elected to Taiwan's Legislative Yuan as a Democratic Progressive Party (DPP) member for Keelung City. Wang formed an alliance with the DPP's Formosa faction, which disbanded after its leader Hsu Hsing-liang left the party. In 2002, Wang became a member of the Justice faction.

Wang was nominated by the DPP to run for Keelung City mayor in 2005. After contentious discussions with the Taiwan Solidarity Union, the DPP agreed to withdraw Wang's nomination to support the TSU's Chen Chien-ming. However, Wang remained on the ballot, and finished fourth in the election.

Commenting on the 2007 summit between South Korean President Roh Moo-hyun and North Korean leader Kim Jong-il, Wang noted that their talks offered a model for negotiations between China and Taiwan held on an equal footing and based on mutual respect.  Lamenting that China refuses to recognise Taiwan as a sovereign, independent state, he urged China to support a bid for UN recognition for Taiwan also called for the removal of the 900 Chinese missiles deployed along its southeastern coast that threaten Taiwan militarily.

After losing his seat in the legislature in January 2008, Wang was appointed chairman of the Council for Cultural Affairs, a cabinet-level position.  From this position, Wang pushed for substantial increases to the culture budget.  In May 2008, Wang was appointed by chairwoman Tsai Ing-wen to serve as the Secretary General of the DPP. In taking on the position, Wang chose not to be paid. He helped the party out of a NT$150 million debt, while reducing its bureaucracy and infighting shortly after the 2008 elections.

Wang died in Taipei on 9 August 2016 at the age of 72, due to complications of a heart attack. His funeral was held on 6 September.

References

1944 births
2016 deaths
Taiwanese male novelists
Democratic Progressive Party Members of the Legislative Yuan
Keelung Members of the Legislative Yuan
Party List Members of the Legislative Yuan
Members of the 3rd Legislative Yuan
Members of the 4th Legislative Yuan
Members of the 5th Legislative Yuan
Members of the 6th Legislative Yuan
National Taiwan Normal University alumni
National Chengchi University alumni
International Writing Program alumni
Taiwanese male short story writers
20th-century novelists
21st-century novelists
Prisoners and detainees of Taiwan
20th-century short story writers
21st-century short story writers
Taiwanese Ministers of Culture
20th-century male writers
21st-century male writers